Soul Therapy is a promo EP by the German punk band Die Toten Hosen, released to promote the subsequent all-English album Crash-Landing.

Track listing
 "Pushed Again" (Breitkopf/Frege) – 3:49
 "Hopeless Happy Song" (Bretikopf, Frege/Frege, Smith) – 2:55
 "Bonnie & Clyde" (Breitkopf/Frege, Smith) – 3:33 (English version)
 "Big Bad Wolf" (v. Holst/Frege, Smith) – 3:53 (English version of "Böser Wolf")
 "Soul Therapy" (Breitkopf/Frege, Smith) – 5:13 (English version of "Seelentherapie")
 "No Escape" (v. Holst/Frege, Smith) – 3:33

Personnel
Campino – vocals
Andreas von Holst – guitar
Michael Breitkopf – guitar
Andreas Meurer – bass
Wolfgang Rohde – drums
Vom Ritchie – drums

References

1998 EPs
Die Toten Hosen EPs